Benjamin Frater (1979–2007), also known as "The Catholic Yak", was an Australian poet.

Biography 
Frater grew up in Western Sydney, and attended the University of Wollongong. He published one book of poetry during his life, Bughouse Meat (2005, Bird in the Mouth Press). A collection of selected poems, 6am in the Universe, was published posthumously (2011,  Grand Parade Poets). He is currently the subject of a feature-length documentary being made by Magical Real Picture Company (Australia).

External links
Obituary Sydney Morning Herald
Auslit entry (full entry requires subscription)
Plaque-1
Plaque-2
composite tertiary reference
review of 6am in the Universe: Selected Poems
radio program
mention re doco award

See the ABC radio national radio documentary
Title: 6am in the Universe Author: Benjamin Frater Publisher: Grand Parade Poets, Wollongong 2011

The meaning of Yek rests between the collective human unconsciousness and the infinite darkness of God. Yek is the Horned Being of ancient man's cave drawings. Yek is Dr Sax, shadow beings and the fear of our own immortality. Benjamin's poetical works represented the individual's deconstruction of the remnants of our cultural prehistory: the poet is the platonic philosopher. Use of repetition and holy indelible mantra to find the basic consonance and resonance within the collective mind. Without fear of the darkness, without seeking recompense - a true visionary poet came and extended the realms of our known art, and relinquished the fragility of the individual and left us.

1979 births
2007 deaths
University of Wollongong alumni
20th-century Australian poets
Australian male poets
20th-century Australian male writers